The 2011 United States Men's Curling Championship qualifiers took place during January at various locations throughout the nation. Prior to the national finals, the number of entrants was pared down to ten teams through regional qualifiers and then a challenge round.

Teams qualified for the men's nationals in one of two ways. Two teams automatically qualified as the top two US teams on the Order of Merit list after the Curl Mesabi Cash Spiel was completed. This year, those two teams were the Pete Fenson and Tyler George rinks.

The remaining eight spots for the nationals were awarded to the top finishers in the regional qualifiers and challenge rounds. Five teams qualified from the qualifiers round, where each qualified site received one or more qualifying spots. The other three spots went to the winners of the challenge round.

Regional qualifiers
This year, there were three regional qualifiers, which will take place in Medford, Wisconsin, Bismarck, North Dakota, and Rochester, New York. The qualifiers will take place from January 5–9. A total of 29 teams (not including the Fenson rink or the George rink) participated in the qualifiers.

The qualifiers either were held using a round-robin format or a knockout format of play. The double knockout provision, which states that a team is eliminated from qualifying for the nationals if the team has at least two losses in their win-loss record, was in place for all three qualifiers. If there are teams with less than two losses, they will play each other until the number of teams still able to qualify matches the number of qualification spots available.

The qualifier scheduled in Seattle, Washington was cancelled because there were not enough teams to meet the minimum five teams that need to sign up for a qualifier in order for it to take place. Two teams transferred to other qualifiers, while two other teams dropped.

Medford qualifier
The Medford qualifier was held in a round robin format with eight teams competing for the top spot. Two teams qualified directly to the nationals in Fargo, while three teams qualified to the Challenge Round in Waupaca.

Teams

Bismarck qualifier
The Bismarck qualifier was held in a knockout format. Eleven teams participated in this qualifier. Two teams qualified directly to the nationals in Fargo, while four teams qualified to the Challenge Round.

Teams

Results

Rochester qualifier
The Rochester qualifier was also held in a knockout format. Ten teams participated in this qualifier. Only one team was able to qualify directly to the nationals, and one team moved on to the Challenge Round.

Teams

*Due to injuries, the Van Cuyck rink withdrew prior to the start of the competition

Results

Challenge round
The challenge round took place in Waupaca, Wisconsin from January 19–23. Up to ten teams qualified for the challenge round; up to eight teams that didn't qualify for the finals from the regionals but placed well in the regionals qualified, and up to two teams qualified if they were among the top ten US Order of Merit teams and did not qualify for the finals or challenge round after the regionals. These teams played in a round robin format for three spots in the nationals.

Teams

*Qualified based on Order of Merit standings
Note: Brady Clark (WA) has chosen to withdraw from the Challenge Round.

Results

Draw 1
Thursday, January 20, 2:00 pm

Draw 2
Thursday, January 20, 7:00 pm

Draw 3
Friday, January 21, 1:00 pm

Draw 4
Friday, January 21, 7:00 pm

Draw 5
Saturday, January 22, 1:00 pm

Draw 6
Saturday, January 22, 7:00 pm

Draw 7
Sunday, January 23, 9:00 am

References

2011 in curling
United States National Curling Championships
2011 in American sports
Qualification for curling competitions